Guizhou or Gui Prefecture was a zhou (prefecture) in imperial China, centering on modern Zhangjiakou, Hebei, China. It was created in 634 by the Tang dynasty and was later ceded by Later Jin to the Khitan-ruled Liao dynasty as one of the Sixteen Prefectures.

Geography
The administrative region of Guizhou in the Tang dynasty is in modern Zhangjiakou in northwestern Hebei. It probably includes parts of modern: 
Zhangjiakou
Huailai County
Zhuolu County
Chicheng County
Chongli County
Xuanhua County
Huai'an County

References
 

Prefectures of the Tang dynasty
Prefectures of Later Tang
Sixteen Prefectures
Former prefectures in Hebei